David Moufang (born 1966, in Heidelberg, West Germany) is a German ambient techno musician. He records with his partner, Jonas Grossmann as Deep Space Network project and his solo releases as Move D. His other projects include Earth to Infinity, Reagenz, Koolfang, and Conjoint.

Biography
Moufang's early influences were space, technology, and, of course, music. After becoming proficient in percussion and guitar, he ventured into the world of early electronic music. In 1989, he was introduced to techno; he spent time in clubs that played ambient techno, and before too long ventured out into production and mixing. Moufang has continued making music into the present day, releasing a number of albums, EPs, and singles, both under the Deep Space Network Moniker as well as his solo name, Move D.

Discography

Full-length albums

Deep Space Network - Big Rooms, Source Records, 1993
Deep Space Network - Earth to Infinity, Source Records, 1993
Earth to Infinity - Earth to Infinity, Silent Records, 1994
Deep Space Network - Big Rooms, Instinct Records, 1994
Reagenz (with Jonah Sharp) - Reagenz, Source Records, 1994
Reagenz (with Jonah Sharp) - Reagenz, Reflective Records, 1994
Dr. Atmo & Deep Space Network - i.f., FAX Records, 1994
Dr. Atmo & Deep Space Network - i.f. 2, FAX Records, 1994
Koolfang (with Pete Namlook)- Jambient, FAX Records, 1995
Koolfang (with Pete Namlook)- Gig In the Sky, FAX Records, 1995
David Moufang - Solitaire, FAX Records, 1995
Move D - Kunststoff, Source Records, 1995
Deep Space Network - Traffic, km 20, km2001, 1996
Move D & Pete Namlook - Exploring the Psychedelic Landscape, FAX Records, 1996
Move D - Cymbelin, Warp Records, 1996
Deep Space Network Meets Higher Intelligence Agency, Source Records, 1997
Move D & Pete Namlook - A Day In the Live!, FAX Records, 1997
Deep Space Network - Traffic / dsn live '95, mp3.com, 1999 
Move D & Thomas Meinecke - Tomboy / Freud's Baby, Intermedium Recordings/Indigo, 1999
Move D & Pete Namlook - The Retro Rocket, FAX Records, 1999
Conjoint - Earprints, Source Records, 2000
Move D & Pete Namlook - Wired, FAX Records, 2001
Move D & Pete Namlook - Live In Heidelberg 2001, FAX Records, 2001
Move D & Benjamin Brunn - Songs from the Beehive, Smallville, 2008
Move D - Namlook XXIII: Stranger III, FAX Records, 2010
Move D - fabric 74: Move D, Fabric Records, 2014
Move D - The Silent Orbiter, ...txt, 2014
Move D - Building Bridges, Aus Music, 2019

EPs
Move D - Silk and Schmoove EP, Compost Records, 2006

Singles
Dan Jordan - Slamdunk / Michigan Flake 12", United States of Mars
d-man / move d - homeworks vol.1 12", Source Records, 1995
move d - homeworks vol.2 12", Source Records
robert gordon & david moufang - view to view 12", Source Records
deep space network - heavy days 12", Source Records
jonah sharp & david moufang - reagenz 12", Source Records
ro 70 meets move d 12", Source Records, ?
move d & ro 70 ii 12", Source Records, ?
Move D - Hurt Me 12", Compost, ?
Move D - "Eine kleine Nachtmusik" 12", Fifth Freedom/Soma, ?
Move D / Sutekh - "Split 10"" 12", Plug Research,

External links 
 David Moufang on Discogs
 David Moufang on Beatport
 Move D (David Moufang) on SoundCloud
 David Moufang on last.fm
 Move D discography on Sound Shelter

References

German techno musicians
Ambient musicians
1966 births
Living people
Deep house musicians